Steven O'Mahoney-Schwartz is an American Magic: The Gathering player. At the height of his career in the late 1990s, he was considered one of the best players. He is well known as a friend and teammate to Jon Finkel.

Career
O'Mahoney-Schwartz first qualified for the Pro Tour in its inaugural season, at Pro Tour Columbus. An unimpressive finish left him outside the top sixty-four needed to win money, and unqualified for the World Championship.

The following season saw O'Mahoney-Schwartz make it back to the Pro Tour with a higher degree of success and consistency. He played five of seven events winning money at two of them.

The following year was O'Mahoney-Schwartz's break-out season. He reached the quarter finals of Grand Prix Toronto, the first event of the season. After a weak finish at Pro Tour Chicago, he made top eight of the second Pro Tour of the year in Mainz. In the elimination bracket, he made it all the way to the finals before losing to Matt Place. A string of Grand Prix top eights including wins in Madrid and Zurich put him in third place in the Player of the Year Race, at the end of the season.

At Pro Tour Los Angeles the following year, he reached the top eight for a second time. He won the event, defeating Mike Long, Terry Lau, and Jon Finkel in the quarterfinals, semifinals, and finals respectively. His other top finishes that season were at Grand Prix Boston and Oslo.

A few months following his win, O'Mahoney-Schwartz made it to the elimination rounds of a Pro Tour for the third and final time. Going by the name Team Antarctica, O'Mahoney-Schwartz, his brother Dan, and Jon Finkel reached the top four of the first teams Pro Tour in Washington D.C. Antarctica lost in the semifinals to Your Move Games, consisting of Darwin Kastle, Rob Dougherty, and Dave Humpherys who would go on to win the tournament.

Following the 1999–2000 season, his career gradually slowed to retirement, although he won Grand Prix Massachusetts in 2007.  On August 19, 2011 it was announced that O'Mahoney-Schwartz will be inducted to the Magic: The Gathering Hall of Fame along with Shuhei Nakamura and Anton Jonsson. The ceremony took place at the Magic: The Gathering World Championships in November.

Achievements

References

Living people
American Magic: The Gathering players
People from Brooklyn
Year of birth missing (living people)